Oribacterium is a strictly anaerobic and non-spore-forming bacterial genus from the family of Lachnospiraceae.

References

Further reading 
 
 

 

Lachnospiraceae
Bacteria genera